Theodore Boone: The Activist is the fourth book in the Theodore Boone series written by John Grisham. It went on sale on May 21, 2013.

Plot summary
Theo becomes involved in the campaign against a planned bypass road skirting his town, because a friend's family farm is threatened.

References

External links
Official site at Penguin Group
Official site at TheodoreBoone.com

2013 American novels
Novels by John Grisham
Legal thriller novels
American children's novels
2013 children's books
E. P. Dutton books
Hodder & Stoughton books